Tribenoside (Glyvenol) is a vasoprotective drug used to treat hemorrhoids. It has mild anti-inflammatory, analgesic, and wound healing properties. Tribenoside stimulates laminin α5 production and laminin-332 deposition to help repair the basement membrane during the wound healing process. It is a mixture of the α- and β-anomers.

Tribenoside has been shown to induce drug hypersensitivity syndrome in association with CMV reactivation.

References

Glucosides
Ethers